The Lady of the Black Moons (Arabic: سيدة الأقمار السوداء, Sayyidat al-aqmār al-sawdāʼ, French: La dame aux lunes noires) is a 1971 Lebanese fantastique-sexploitation film directed by Lebanese director Samir A. Khouri and featuring a neh predominantly Egyptian main cast. The film had particular success in Tunisia as well as Lebanon. The Lady of the Black Moons was released on DVD by Sabbah Media Corporation in 2002.

Plot
Aida (Nahed Yousri) is married to rich and older Sami (Adel Adham) but she still suffers because of her love to Omar (Hussein Fahmy). While Sami's sister Gigi (Shahinaz) grows an affection for Omar, Aida tries to find satisfaction with male prostitutes at the house of Victoria (Theodora Rasi) but she has violent dreams during full moon, reflecting her traumatic past.

Cast
Nahed Yousri: Aida
Adel Adham: Sami
Hussein Fahmy: Omar
Shahinaz: Gigi / Juliette
Theodora Rasi: Victoria
Philippe Akiki: Sami's father

References

External links
 
 Sayyidat al-aqmār al-sawdāʼ at ElCinema

1971 films
Sexploitation films
1970s Arabic-language films
Lebanese drama films